Charmkhowran-e Bala (also Romanized as Charmkhowrān-e Bālā and Charmkhvorān-e Bālā) is a village in Abbas-e Gharbi Rural District, Tekmeh Dash District, Bostanabad County, East Azerbaijan Province, Iran. At the 2006 census, its population was 206, in 43 families.

References 

Populated places in Bostanabad County